The list of Europeans by net worth is based on an annual assessment of wealth and assets compiled and published by Forbes magazine in 2022. In the same year, the continent of Europe had over 500 billionaires (in USD). The countries with the most billionaires are: Germany (134), Russia (83), Italy (52), United Kingdom (49), Sweden (45), France (43) and Switzerland (41).

Annual rankings

2022

2021

2019

See also 

 Lists of billionaires
 List of countries by the number of billionaires

References 

Economy of Europe-related lists
Lists of people by wealth